Plota is a rural locality (a selo) in Prokhorovsky District, Belgorod Oblast, Russia. The population was 438 as of 2010. There are 7 streets.

Geography 
Plota is located 17 km south of Prokhorovka (the district's administrative centre) by road. Maloyablonovo is the nearest rural locality.

References 

Rural localities in Prokhorovsky District